Daniel Danis (born 1986) is a South Sudanese film director and radio host.

Biography
Danis is half Dinka and half Nuer. He was born in what is now South Sudan but fled to Kenya at the age of seven due to the Second Sudanese Civil War. He settled at the Kakuma Refugee Camp in Kenya. In 2000, at the age of 14, Danis helped found the Woyee Film and Theatre Industry to perform plays to keep busy at the camp. The group wrote and performed plays that on subjects that spoke to the refugees like HIV, domestic violence and women's rights. It attracted attention from non-governmental organizations, which hired Woyee to make short educational films, and Danis learned filmmaking from FilmAid International. After the war ended in 2005, the collective continued to grow and acquired an office in Juba. Danis and others devoted the money they made from making films for UN agencies into buying a camera and editing software. The Woyee group rotated the main roles of director, cameraman, actors, and crew among different members. 

In 2011, Danis directed the first feature film in South Sudan, Jamila. The plot concerns a young woman, her boyfriend, and an older man interested in her. Because the only cinema in South Sudan had been destroyed, it was screened at a local cultural center. It received an enthusiastic reception from the over 500 people who showed up on the first day, many of whom could not believe it was South Sudanese and drawing comparisons to Nollywood. In 2012, Danis helped launch the first film festival in South Sudan. By 2015, it had attracted over 5,000 students, audience members, and participants.

Danis is also a radio presenter at Eye Radio in Nairobi, and has interviewed notable figures such as former U.S. Secretary of State John Kerry. In 2017, Danis opened a recording studio in Kampala. He assigned the singer S-Bizzy to be the station manager. Known as Jam Records, the studio seeks to promote the work of South Sudanese artists based in Uganda.

References

External links
Daniel Danis, Author at Eye Radio

1986 births
Living people
South Sudanese film directors
South Sudanese expatriates in Kenya